The brown speckled eel or Steindachner's moray eel, Gymnothorax steindachneri, is a moray eel found in coral reefs in the eastern central Pacific Ocean, around Hawaii. It was first named by Jordan and Evermann in 1903. It is rarely seen in the wild due to its aggressive nature. It will lie waiting for a passing animal, and then ambush it.

References

steindachneri
Fish described in 1903
Taxa named by David Starr Jordan